Chiloglottis sylvestris, commonly known as the small wasp orchid, is a small, delicate species of orchid endemic to eastern Australia. It has two dark green leaves and a single greenish pink flower with a reddish black, insect-like callus surrounded by fine, radiating, red, club-shaped calli on two-thirds of the base of the labellum.

Description
There is a reddish black, insect-like callus covering about two-thirds of the middle of the base of the labellum. This large callus is surrounded by many fine, radiating, reddish, club-shaped calli and smaller red calli. The column has narrow wings. Flowering occurs from December to May.

Taxonomy and naming
Chiloglottis sylvestris was first formally described in 1987 by David Jones and Mark Clements from a specimen collected near Springbrook and the description was published in Proceedings of the Royal Society of Queensland. The specific epithet (sylvestris) is a Latin word meaning "of woods".

Distribution and habitat
The small wasp orchid grows in moist places in tall forest and rainforest between Eungella in Queensland and Robertson in New South Wales.

References

External links 

sylvestris
Orchids of New South Wales
Orchids of Queensland
Plants described in 1987